Gina Silva is a newscaster who works for KTTV Fox News and KCOP.  She does live reports for Good Day LA and Fox 11 Morning News.  Before moving to the morning shift, Gina  worked on special projects (Investigative/Consumer).  She also anchored the Sunday morning news with Robb Weller.  Gina fills in for the morning and evening anchors on both KTTV and KCOP.  In addition to reporting, Miss Silva does portrait photography.  Her work can be seen at Ginasilvaphotography.com.  From 2001 through 2003 Gina co-anchored the KCOP weekend news with Kent Ninomiya.  Prior to working at KTTV, Gina was a national correspondent for the entertainment program Extra (television show) from 1997 to 2000.
Before Extra and KTTV, Gina worked for KNXV, the ABC affiliate in Phoenix.  There, she was a member of the exclusive unit "The Investigators".  Gina's past experience also includes reporting and anchoring for KOLD, the CBS affiliate in Tucson and the  Univision network in  Phoenix. She has a degree in Broadcast Journalism from the Walter Cronkite School of Journalism and Mass Communication at Arizona State University.

References

External links 
Gina Silva's page at Fox 11 Web site

Walter Cronkite School of Journalism and Mass Communication alumni
Television anchors from Los Angeles
American reporters and correspondents
American infotainers
Year of birth missing (living people)
Living people